The Karelin Islands are a group of islands  in extent, lying  southeast of Tula Point, Renaud Island, in the Biscoe Islands of Antarctica. They were first accurately shown on an Argentine government chart of 1957, and were named by the UK Antarctic Place-Names Committee in 1959 for Dmitriy Karelin (1913–1953), a Soviet meteorologist and pioneer of research on sea ice recording and forecasting.

See also 
List of Antarctic and sub-Antarctic islands

References

Islands of the Biscoe Islands